Agniparvatham is a 1979 Indian Malayalam film, directed by P. Chandrakumar and produced by K. P. Kottarakkara. The film stars Madhu, Srividya, Ambika and Jose Prakash in the lead roles. The film has musical score by Pukazhenthi.

It was the remake of Tamil hit Thanga Pathakkam

Cast
Madhu as S.P Viswanathan
Srividya as Lakshmi
Ambika as Vimala
Jose Prakash as Kaduva Ramu
Sathaar as Ragu
Kundara Johnny 
Master Ravikumar
 Sankaradi
 Manjeri Chandran
 T. P. Madhavan as Police Officer
 Mala Aravindan as P C Mathai
 Sam
 Bhim Raj
 Paramu
 Suresh
 Gopan Kalharam
 Oduvil Unnikrishnan
 Aryad Gopalakrishnan
 Latha
 K.P Kumar

Soundtrack
The music was composed by Pukazhenthi.

References

External links
 
 

1979 films
1970s Malayalam-language films
Films scored by Pukazhenthi
Films directed by P. Chandrakumar